Jaunpur may refer to the following places in India:
Jaunpur, Uttar Pradesh, a city
Jaunpur district
Jaunpur Lok Sabha constituency
Jaunpur Assembly constituency
Jaunpur Sultanate, a 15th-century northern Indian kingdom
Jaunpur, Uttarakhand, an administrative division of Tehri Garhwal district

See also
Jaunpuri (disambiguation)